The chiming wedgebill (Psophodes occidentalis), sometimes referred to as chiming whipbird, is a species of bird in the family Psophodidae.
It is endemic to Australia.  The chiming wedgebill and chirruping wedgebill (Psophodes occidentalis) were considered a single species until as late as 1973, when they were separated due to marked differences in their calls.

The chiming wedgebill makes a cooing sound during mating.

References

chiming wedgebill
Endemic birds of Australia
chiming wedgebill
Taxonomy articles created by Polbot